Morris is a former provincial electoral division in the Canadian province of Manitoba.  It was created by redistribution in 1879 and named after the town and municipality of Morris, which in turn are named after Alexander Morris, who served as Lieutenant Governor of Manitoba from 1872 to 1877.

Following the redistribution of Manitoba electoral districts in 2011, the riding was bordered to the south by Emerson, to the north by Lakeside, to the west by Midland and Portage la Prairie, and to the east by Steinbach, Dawson Trail, Assiniboia, Kirkfield Park and Charleswood.

The largest communities in the riding were Morris, Niverville, and La Salle.  Other communities included Elie, Oak Bluff, Sanford,  Starbuck, Ste. Agathe,  St. Eustache and St. Francois Xavier.
 
In 1999, the average family income was $53,719, and the unemployment rate was 3.90%.  Agriculture accounted for 23% of the riding's industry, followed by the retail trade at 10%.  Eighteen per cent of Morris's residents were of German background, and a further 17% were French.  The riding had the third-highest percentage of Francophones in Manitoba.

The Progressive Conservative Party of Manitoba represented Morris from 1954 to 2019, and the riding was generally regarded as safe for the party.

The Morris riding was eliminated ahead of the 2019 Manitoba general election and its territory was redistributed to the Midland, La Verendrye, and newly-formed Springfield-Ritchot ridings.

List of provincial representatives

Election results

1879 general election

1883 general election

1886 general election

1888 general election

1892 general election

1896 general election

1899 general election

1900 by-election

1903 general election

1907 general election

1910 general election

1914 general election

1915 general election

1920 general election

1922 general election

1927 general election

1929 by-election

1932 general election

1936 general election

1941 general election

1945 general election

1949 general election

1953 general election

1958 general election

1959 general election

1962 general election

1966 general election

1969 by-election

1969 general election

1973 general election

1977 general election

1981 general election

1986 general election

1988 general election

1990 general election

1995 general election

1999 general election

2003 general election

2007 general election

2011 general election

2014 by-election

2016 general election

Previous boundaries

References

Elections Manitoba - Historical Summary 

Former provincial electoral districts of Manitoba